Naveed Mahbub is a Bangladeshi comedian and columnist. He was awarded Best Male Comedian in the 2007 Las Vegas Comedy Festival. In 2016, Mahbub was featured in US-based comedy television channel Comedy Central. He hosts a morning radio show, Good Morning Bangladesh, on ABC Radio. He writes articles on the newspaper The Daily Star.

Education
Mahbub passed SSC from Government Laboratory High School, Dhaka, HSC from Dhaka College and completed his bachelor's in electrical engineering from Bangladesh University of Engineering and Technology and master's from the University of Michigan, Ann Arbor. While he was an MBA student at the University of California, Berkeley, he took a course in the Sandi Shore's Standup Comedy Workshop.

Career
For 13 years, Mahbub served as an engineer at Ford Motor Company, Kyocera Wireless and Qualcomm in the United States and the CEO of IBM and Nokia Siemens Networks Bangladesh.

Mahbub had performed as a stand-up comic in the United States in the 2000s. He returned to Bangladesh in 2009. He founded the country's first comedy club, Naveed's Comedy Club in 2010.

Since June 2012, Mahbub hosted a late night television talk show "Grameenphone Presents – The Naveed Mahbub Show".

He claims to have acted in a small role in the film You Don't Mess with the Zohan, featuring Adam Sandler and Rob Schneider even though he isn't seen anywhere in the film.

Books

 Humorously Yours and Counting (2015)

Personal life
He married Zara Mahbub in 1998. They have two daughters, Zaina  and Maryam.

References 

Living people
Bangladeshi comedians
Bangladeshi columnists
Bangladeshi male writers
Bangladesh University of Engineering and Technology alumni
University of Michigan College of Engineering alumni
Year of birth missing (living people)
Haas School of Business alumni